Katina Paxinou (17 December 1900– 22 February 1973) was a Greek film and stage actress.

She started her stage career in Greece in 1928 and was one of the founding members of the National Theatre of Greece in 1932. The outbreak of World War II found her in the United Kingdom and she later moved to the United States, where she made her film debut in For Whom the Bell Tolls (1943) and won the Academy Award for Best Supporting Actress and the Golden Globe Award for Best Supporting Actress. She appeared in a few more Hollywood films, before returning to Greece in the early 1950s. She became a naturalized citizen of the United States in 1951. She then focused on her stage career and appeared in a number of European films including Rocco and His Brothers (1960).

Early life
Paxinou was born Ekaterini Konstantopoulou in 1900, the daughter of Vassilis Konstantopoulos and Eleni Malandrinou. She trained as an opera singer at the Conservatoire de Musique de Genève and later in Berlin and Vienna. According to her biography in a 1942 Playbill, Paxinou's family disowned her after she decided to seek a permanent stage career.

Career

Paxinou made her debut at the Municipal Theatre of Piraeus in 1920 in the operatic version of Maurice Maeterlinck's Sister Beatrice, with a score by Dimitri Mitropoulos. She first appeared in a play in 1928, as a member of Marika Kotopouli's troupe, in an Athens production of Henry Bataille's The Naked Woman. In 1931, she joined Aimilios Veakis' troupe along with Alexis Minotis, where she translated and appeared in the first of Eugene O'Neill's plays to be staged in Greece, Desire Under the Elms. She also appeared in Anton Chekhov's Uncle Vanya and August Strindberg's The Father.

In 1932, Paxinou was among the actors who inaugurated the recently re-founded National Theatre of Greece, where she worked until 1940. During her stay in the National Theatre, she distinguished herself on Greek stage starring in major plays, such as Sophocles' Electra, Henrik Ibsen's Ghosts and William Shakespeare's Hamlet, which were also performed in London, Frankfurt and Berlin.
When World War II began, Paxinou was performing in London. Unable to return to Greece, she emigrated in May 1941 to the United States, where she had earlier appeared in 1931, performing Clytemnestra in a modern Greek version of Electra.

She was selected to play the role of Pilar in the film For Whom the Bell Tolls (1943), for which she won an Oscar and a Golden Globe Award for Best Supporting Actress - Motion Picture. She made one British film, Uncle Silas (1947), which features Jean Simmons in the main female role and worked in Italy for 20th Century Fox, playing the mother of Tyrone Power's character in Prince of Foxes (1949). After this film, Paxinou worked for a Hollywood studio only once more, again playing a gypsy woman in the religious epic The Miracle (1959).

In 1950, Paxinou resumed her stage career. In her native Greece, she formed the Royal Theatre of Athens with Alexis Minotis, her principal director and husband since 1940.

Paxinou made several appearances on the Broadway stage and television as well. She played the lead in Ibsen's Hedda Gabler for 12 performances at New York City's Longacre Theatre, opening on 28 June 1942.  She also played the principal role in the first production in English of Federico Garcia Lorca's The House of Bernarda Alba, at the ANTA Playhouse in New York in 1951, and a BBC television production of Lorca's Blood Wedding (Bodas de sangre), broadcast on 2 June 1959.

Death
Paxinou died after a long battle with cancer in Athens on 22 February 1973 at the age of 72. She was survived by her husband and her one daughter from her first marriage to Ioannis Paxinos, whose surname she continued using after their divorce. Her remains are buried at First Cemetery of Athens.

Museum
The Paxinou-Minotis Museum is an Athens museum featuring memorabilia of the life of Paxinou, including furniture, paintings and sketches, photographs, books and personal effects donated by Paxinou's husband, director Alexis Minotis, and include his personal library and theatrical archive.

Filmography

References

External links
 
 
 
 
 

1900 births
1973 deaths
People with acquired American citizenship
20th-century American actresses
American film actresses
American stage actresses
20th-century Greek actresses
Actresses from Athens
Best Supporting Actress Academy Award winners
Best Supporting Actress Golden Globe (film) winners
Burials at the First Cemetery of Athens
Deaths from cancer in Greece
Greek film actresses
Greek stage actresses
Actors from Piraeus
Malandrinos family
Greek expatriates in the United States
Expatriate actresses in the United States